Sonja Škorić (born 26 February 1996 in Pančevo, Serbia) is a singer-songwriter who won the Serbian national selection for the Junior Eurovision Song Contest 2010.

On 26 September 2010, she won the Serbian national selection for the Junior Eurovision Song Contest 2010 in Minsk with the song "Čarobna noć".

Sonja has been singing since the age of five, in 2002 she won the Raspevano proleće contest; in between 2003 and 2005 she won the same contest in a streak. In April 2010, she was Serbia's entry at the San Remo junior contest in Italy.

References

Living people
21st-century Serbian women singers
Serbian pianists
Serbian child singers
1996 births
Serbian singer-songwriters
Serbian pop singers
People from Pančevo
21st-century pianists
Junior Eurovision Song Contest entrants
21st-century women pianists